Banks Simpson (November 4, 1916 – April 30, 2009) was a NASCAR Grand National Series driver who participated in only the 1955 season.

Career summary
He was a competitor in the 1955 Southern 500, the 1955 Mid-South 250, and the 1955 Wilkes 160. While he never won a race or finished in the top ten, Simpson would go on to earn $870 in total career earnings ($ when adjusted for inflation) along with experiencing  of NASCAR Grand National Series racing. The races that he did were in the #20 Buick.

References

1916 births
2009 deaths
NASCAR drivers
People from Concord, North Carolina
Racing drivers from Charlotte, North Carolina
Racing drivers from North Carolina